The becquerel (symbol: Bq) is the SI derived unit of radioactivity, named after Henri Becquerel

Becquerel may also refer to:

People
 Becquerel family, a family of French scientists 
Antoine César Becquerel (1788–1878)
Alexandre-Edmond Becquerel (1820-1891)
Henri Becquerel (1852-1908), Nobel laureate and namesake of the term becquerel
Jean Becquerel (1878-1953)
Louis Alfred Becquerel (1814-1862)

Places
 6914 Becquerel, asteroid
 Becquerel (lunar crater)
 Becquerel (Martian crater)

Other uses
 Becquerel, a dog in the web comic Homestuck
 Becquerel effect, alternative name for the photo-voltaic effect
 Becquerel Prize, prize for contributions to photovoltaic research
 Becquerel Rays, the original name given to radioactivity
 Becquerelite, a uranium mineral